Aleksandr Puzevich (born 18 March 1994) is a Belarusian professional footballer who plays for Partizan Soligorsk.

References

External links 
 
 

1995 births
Living people
Belarusian footballers
Association football midfielders
FC Torpedo-BelAZ Zhodino players
FC Belshina Bobruisk players
FC Smorgon players
FC Smolevichi players
FC Granit Mikashevichi players
FC Baranovichi players
FC Viktoryja Marjina Horka players
FC Shakhtyor Petrikov players